E. lutea may refer to:

 Eatoniella lutea, a sea snail
 Eilema lutea, an Afro-Eurasian moth
 Ekhidna lutea, an environmental bacterium
 Eleotris lutea, a sleeper goby
 Eleutherobia lutea, a soft coral
 Empis lutea, a dance fly
 Encarsia lutea, a parasitic wasp
 Endamoeba lutea, an amoeboid without mitochondria
 Epigelasma lutea, an emerald moth
 Epithele lutea, a bracket fungus
 Erecella lutea, a daddy longlegs
 Erioptera lutea, a crane fly
 Euhesma lutea, an Australian bee
 Euphylidorea lutea, a crane fly
 Euproctis lutea, an Oceanian moth
 Eutaxia lutea, a plant native to Australia